Dominant narrative can be used to describe the lens in which history is told by the perspective of the dominant culture. This term has been described as an "invisible hand" that guides reality and perceived reality. Dominant narrative can refer to multiple aspects of life, such as history, politics, or different activist groups. Dominant culture is defined as the majority cultural practices of a society. Narrative can be defined as story telling, either true or imaginary. Pairing these two terms together create the notion of dominant narrative, that only the majority story is told and therefore heard. It is a common theme to hear or learn only about the dominant narrative as it comprises the perspective of the majority culture. Examples of dominant narrative can be seen throughout history. Dominant narrative can be defined and decided by the sociopolitical and socioeconomic setting someone lives his or her life in.

Dominant narrative is similar in some ways to the ideas of metanarrative or grand narrative.  These two terms refer to the notion that there is a common lived experience, or a totalizing narrative, experience, or account of history. Unlike the above terms, dominant narrative as a concept is used to explain not just only that there is one narrative told, but what makes it possible for that to be the narrative that is told. This term addresses what the reasons are that the dominant narrative is, in fact, dominant or the majority account.

It is also important to look at who is not included in the dominant narrative and how this can affect society and people in those marginalized groups. Not everyone has access to being a part of the dominant narrative. Counter-narrative has been coined as the term regarding the stories and lived experiences of those not in the dominant narrative or not allowed to be a part of it. Counter-narrative are used as a way to share minorities stories excluded and combat the dominant narrative. Counter-narratives, one of the six tenets of Critical race theory, refer to the “silencing of minority perspectives to legitimize power and to a writing of history that includes the voices and perspectives of oppressed groups and challenges liberal claims of neutrality, color blindness and universal truths”.

Who is the dominant narrative? 
The dominant narrative can most often be seen as those that occupy scholar Judith Lorber's A-Categories. Lorber defines and describes A-category members as those that occupy the dominant group in different aspects of life. For example, that can be seen in the topic of race (human categorization) with white being the A-category and all minorities being the not-A; or in the topic of gender with man being the A-category while woman being the not-A. This notion includes all intersectionalities such as age, sexual orientation, CIS/Transgender, ableism, education, and citizenship. The dominant narrative are those that take part in and benefit from being associated with the dominant culture. Having forms of privilege and power that come from being in Lorber's A Categories, can directly relate to being in the dominant culture. The dominant narrative simply consists of whose voice can be recognized and represented when retelling stories, or whose voice/story is perceived as valid or real.

Critiques and concerns with dominant narrative. 
There are a number of critiques and concerns with there being a dominant narrative in society. Many of the critiques of there being a dominant narrative come from the exclusion of counter-narratives. To fully understand what the dominant narrative is and understand examples of it is necessary to understand its limitations. Some limitations with there being a dominant narrative include the following:

Metanarrative among dominant group 
Having a dominant narrative can create a notion that there is a metanarrative among the dominant group, meaning all apart of the dominant group are experiencing life the same way. In using the example of the caucasian dominant narrative, this would mean that all Caucasians of somewhat similar sociopolitical and socioeconomic standing are experiencing life and events the same, and that is not true. A dominant narrative can generalize the lived experiences of people within the dominant culture. The metanarrative among the dominant culture creates the notion that whiteness is the norm, and that the dominant culture is the normal culture to which other cultures need to adapt. The perceived sense of normalcy can be very problematic because it encourages people within the majority to not change and question what could be wrong with having such a strong dominant narrative.

Ignores the lived experiences of minorities 
Having a dominant narrative based on the dominant culture, therefore means anyone not in the dominant culture cannot be a part of the dominant narrative. Since the dominant narrative is accepted as the norm this, therefore, means those not in the dominant narrative are abnormal. Someone's narrative and perceived narrative can greatly affect how someone views themselves and relates to themselves. If someone is not part of the dominant narrative and their story is not being told, that means their lived experiences are being ignored and in turn written out of history. Lived experiences, similar to counter-narratives, can be defined as everyday experiences people face and most often referring to those in the minority group. Lived experiences have also been called material realities, meaning that they are the real, tangible experiences and realities that people live on a daily basis, even if they are counter to the dominant narrative. Terry is cited for explaining how inequalities, can affect which narrative and tellings are able to be heard and which aren't. If the stories of people with inequalities are not heard, then this completely ignores them, and any agency they could have in society.

How does society ever know the truth? 
Jeyn Roberts is quoted for saying "there are three sides to every story. Yours. Mine. What really happened: the truth." Dominant narrative makes it so only one side of any story is told, this completely ignores any other sides or even the truth. By definition, a dominant narrative does not include every and all aspects of any event. By only learning about and studying the dominant narrative then people are only being educated partially about any historical or current events. This creates a false historical account of most of history. Winston Churchill has been associated with the saying "history is written by the victors." This saying directly relates to the concept of dominant narrative and how the full truth of events as it relates to minorities is not being retold. This means that through mainstream education and media people are not being put forth the most accurate information and historical accounts.

Examples of dominant narrative 
Dominant narrative can be seen in almost any aspect of life from media, history, advertising, and activism. The following are some examples of places dominant narrative can be present:

History 
History is one of the most important fields to acknowledge that dominant narrative is present. It is important for people to have a full and accurate understanding of historical events, this is often muddled by the dominant narrative. A historical example of dominant narrative ignoring contributions of people of color can be seen in the military realm. A historical example of black men being ignored for their contributions to the US Military can be understood in the instance of the Tuskegee Airmen. The Tuskegee Airmen was a program based out of Tuskegee, AZ in 1941, in which African-American men were trained and educated in multiple aspects relating to war aircraft. Due to racist ideologies many opposed African-American men being trained to become US Military pilots. Although the Tuskegee Airman overcame great obstacles and contributed immensely to US Military acts in World War II, they have not been given considerable recognition until Bill Clinton commemorated Tuskegee as a national historic site. Even though the Tuskegee Airmen deserved recognition for all they were contributing to the war and in terms of overcoming racial prejudices, because of the WWII dominant narrative they were not given recognition until people fought for their behalf. There are many other historical contributions made by people not in the dominant culture, which are never retroactively recognized and acknowledged.

Indigenous Peoples in North America 
A dominant historical narrative exists in U.S. portrayal of Indigenous peoples pre-European contact. Proponents of the counter narrative argue that, through education, cinema, and media, the American society portrays indigenous peoples as far less civilized than their European colonizers. Academia asserts that this notion is in fact a fallacy, perpetuated by a systemic type of xenophobia that labels indigenous cultures as “uncivilized” or “savage.” In attempts to reshape this general misconception, a counter narrative regarding the perception of Indigenous peoples has come to light. For instance, contrary to popular belief, Indigenous peoples had complex, structured societies prior to European contact. Vast infrastructure, extensive trade networks, and governing bodies were already in place. The Muskogees even had a ruling structure strikingly similar to the three branches of government that exist today in the U.S. The Anasazi developed a circuit of roads, and the main commercial areas—Chaco Canyon and Cahokia, present-day New Mexico and Missouri, respectively—facilitated the exchange of the three sisters crops of corn, squash, and beans, and tallow, a residue of mutton fat essential to the local pemmican diet. To supporters of this counter narrative, the widespread use of the three sisters crops and tallow across the entire continent demonstrates the efficiency of the Indigenous people's interconnected trade networks, and further challenges the dominant master narrative depicting the Indigenous peoples as uncivilized.

News Media 
Like historical accounts, journalism and news media can also be framed in the dominant narrative lens. This historical dominant narrative can affect what news people are actually being exposed to. This is problematic because only news that the dominant narrative deems important receives the most media attention. 
An example of the dominant narrative at play in the media can be seen in the way the Rwandan genocide  was almost completely ignored by Western media and news. This genocide consists of the ethnic majority group, the Hutu, attempting to extinguish the Tutsi ethnic group. Initially, the Rwandan genocide was not framed by the media as a genocide, in an attempt to ignore the severity of the event. The early developments  of the Rwandan genocide were minimalized as a way to justify a lack of intervention by many countries. Since the events in Rwanda did not directly affect US citizens the genocide did not seem to be as big of a deal in media, especially because the genocide consisted of black non-Americans this genocide was hardly discussed, as it is a counter-narrative to the dominant narrative. But even when race is not a factor at play the mass media can shape the dominant narrative in a way to instil indifference and avoid intervention. This happened, for instance, during the early phases of the breakup of Yugoslavia, as many international authorities disputed and denied that a genocide was taking place in Bosnia.

Activism 
People who do not fit into the dominant narrative can also be written out of activist movements, and in turn written out of history later on. There are some needs and intersections of privilege that are necessary to participate in some forms of activism. Not everyone is able to participate in activist work because of their socioeconomic status, their sociopolitical status, their job safety, their families or childcare needs. Limitations like those just mentioned can greatly affect who is active and participates in social activism. Because someone, most likely not in the dominant culture, may not have the means to participate that means their narrative may not be shared. An example of dominant narrative in activism can be seen in Women's rights movements. First-wave feminism has been critiqued for a lack of inclusion of black women and race in their movements. Feminist history is often explained in a framework of the contributions made by white affluent and educated American or British women. White women with higher socioeconomic standings were not the only women that took part in the first-wave feminist activism, but most often were the only ones that were given access to political gains and recognition.

References

Historiography
Social constructionism